Thomas Williams may refer to:

Academics
Thomas Williams, Gresham Professor of Astronomy
Thomas Desmond Williams (1921–1987), Irish academic and Professor of Modern History at University College Dublin
Thomas R. Williams, Canadian educator, 19th principal of Queen's University
T. Harry Williams (1909–1979), historian at Louisiana State University
Thomas Williams, Assistant Dean, Sandra Day O'Connor College of Law
T. C. Williams, American educator for whom T. C. Williams High School, Alexandria, Virginia, is named

Arts
Thomas Williams (cartoonist) (1940–2002), English cartoonist
Thomas Williams (Christadelphian) (1847–1913), editor of the Christadelphian Advocate magazine
Thomas Williams (writer) (1926–1990), American novelist
Tennessee Williams (born Thomas Lanier Williams, 1911–1983), American playwright
Thomas Richard Williams (1825–1871), British photographer
Ras Shiloh (born 1975), stage name for reggae artist Thomas Williams
Thomas Chatterton Williams (born 1981), American writer

Military
Thomas Williams (Australian Army officer) (1884–1950), Australian major general
Thomas Williams (Union general) (1815–1862), Union general during the American Civil War
Thomas Williams (Royal Navy officer) (1761/62-1841), British admiral
Thomas Williams (RAF officer) (1899–1956), British air marshal
Thomas F. Williams (1885–1985), Canadian First World War flying ace
Thomas J. Williams (1837–1866), American Union general during the American Civil War

Religion
Thomas Williams (priest and translator) (1658–1726), Welsh Anglican priest
Thomas Williams (vicar apostolic of the Northern District) (1661–1740), Roman Catholic bishop
Thomas Williams (Congregational minister) (1725–1770), Congregational minister
Thomas Williams (1755–1839), author of the Cottage Bible
Thomas Williams (1779–1876), Congregational minister
Thomas Williams (Christadelphian), (1847-1913)
Thomas Rhondda Williams (1860–1945), Welsh Congregational minister
Thomas Charles Williams (1868–1927), Welsh Calvinistic Methodist minister
Thomas Williams (dean of Bangor) (1870–1941), Welsh Anglican priest
Thomas Leighton Williams (1877–1946), British Roman Catholic archbishop
Thomas Williams (archdeacon of Craven) (1889–1956), Anglican priest
Thomas Williams (cardinal) (born 1930), Roman Catholic bishop
Thomas Williams (dean of Llandaff) (died 1877), Welsh Anglican priest

Politicians

Australia
Thomas Williams (South Australian politician) (c. 1794–1881), politician in the colony of South Australia
Thomas Williams (Australian politician) (1897–1992), Australian politician
Thomas Williams (New South Wales politician) (1862–1953), Australian politician

United Kingdom 
Thomas Williams (by 1518-79/90), MP for Oxford
Thomas Williams (speaker) (1513/4–1566), Speaker of the House of Commons
Thomas Williams (Warrington MP) (1915–1986), British Labour Co-operative politician
Thomas Williams of Llanidan (1737–1802), Welsh lawyer and businessman known as the “Copper King of Parys Mountain”, MP for Marlow 1790–1802
Thomas Williams, 1st Baron Williams (1892–1966), British life peer and Labour Party member
Jeremiah Williams (British politician) (Thomas Jeremiah Williams, 1872–1919), Welsh barrister and Liberal politician
Thomas Peers Williams (1795–1875), MP for Marlow 1820–1868, Father of the House, 1867–1868; grandson of Thomas Williams of Llanidan
T. Russell Williams (1869–1926), socialist activist
Thomas Williams (Kennington MP) (1877–1927), British Member of Parliament for Kennington, 1923–1924
Sir Thomas Williams, 1st Baronet (c. 1621–1712), English medical doctor and Member of Parliament for Weobley
Thomas Williams of Edwinsford (died 1762), Custos Rotulorum of Carmarthenshire from 1745 to 1762

United States 
Thomas Williams (Alabama politician) (1825–1903), US representative
Thomas Williams (Pennsylvania politician) (1806–1872), US representative
Thomas Edward Williams (politician) (1849–1931), American politician in Wisconsin and Nebraska
Thomas Hickman Williams (1801–1851), US senator from Mississippi, 1837–1838
Thomas Hill Williams (1780–1840), US senator from Mississippi, 1817–1828
Thomas Scott Williams (1777–1861), US representative from Connecticut
Thomas Sutler Williams (1872–1940), US representative from Illinois
Thomas Wheeler Williams (1789–1874), US representative from Connecticut
Thomas W. Williams (Los Angeles) (c. 1867–1931), church minister and member of the Los Angeles, California, City Council

Sport
Thomas Williams (American football) (born 1984), American football player
Thomas Williams (cricketer, born 1884) (1884–1954), Welsh cricketer
Thomas Williams (Irish cricketer) (1908–1982), Irish cricketer
Thomas Williams (figure skater) (born 1991), Canadian ice dancer
Thomas Williams (rugby league), rugby league footballer of the 1910s for Wales, and Oldham
Thomas Williams (soccer) (born 2004), American soccer player
Thomas Williams Jr. (born 1987), American boxer

Others
Thomas H. Williams (California official) (1828–1886), attorney general of California, 1858–1862
Thomas Lyle Williams (1896–1976), American businessman
Thomas Williams (manufacturer) (1846–?), New Zealand ironfounder and businessman
Thomas Williams (Mayflower), signatory of the Mayflower Compact
Thomas Williams (pioneer) (died 1785), early settler to Detroit, Michigan and grandfather of general Thomas Williams
Thomas Williams (died 1831), murderer, one of the London Burkers
Thomas Walter Williams (1763–1833), English barrister, known as a legal writer
Thomas Williams (Northern Rhodesian speaker) (1893–1967), Speaker of the Legislative Council of Northern Rhodesia

See also
Thomas Thangathurai William, Sri Lankan politician
Tom Williams (disambiguation) 
Tomos Williams (born 1995), Welsh rugby union player